Great Mosque of Algiers may refer to:

 Great Mosque of Algiers, or Djamaa el Kebir, built in 1097
 Great Mosque of Algiers, or Djamaa el Djazaïr, built in 2012